Cressat is a commune in the Creuse department in the Nouvelle-Aquitaine region in central France.

Geography
The river Creuse flows past on the southwestern boundary of the commune.

Population

Sights
 The church, dating from the fifteenth century.
 The stained glass factory / workshop.

See also
Communes of the Creuse department

References

External links

Website of Créarts glass 

Communes of Creuse